Luca is a given name used predominantly for males, mainly in Latin America, Italy, Spain, Portugal, Romania. It is derived from the Latin name Lucas. It may also come from the Latin word "lucus" meaning "sacred wood" (a cognate of lucere). The name is common among Christians as a result of Luke the Evangelist.

Notable people bearing the name include:

 Luca Arbore (1486–1523), Moldavian statesman
 Luca Attanasio (1977–2021), Italian diplomat
 Luca Badoer (born 1971) Italian racing driver
 Luca Badr (born 1992), Egyptian football player
 Luca Barbarossa (born 1961), Italian singer-songwriter
 Luca Belcastro (born 1964), Italian composer
 Luca Caputi (born 1988), Canadian ice hockey player
 Luca Caragiale (1893–1921), Romanian poet
 Luca Ciriani (born 1967), Italian politician
 Luca Cordero di Montezemolo (born 1947), Italian businessman and former President of Ferrari
 Luca Cunti (born 1989), Swiss ice hockey player
 Luca Dalmonte (born 1963), Italian basketball coach
 Luca De Carlo (born 1972), Italian politician
 Luca Engstler (born 2000), German racing driver
 Luca Giordano (1634–1705), Italian painter
 Luca Guadagnino (born 1971), Italian film director
 Luca Margaroli (born 1992), Swiss tennis player
 Luca Marinelli (born 1984), Italian actor
 Luca Napolitano (born 1982), Italian singer
 Luca Pacioli (1447–1517), Italian mathematician
 Luca Parmitano (born 1976), Italian astronaut
 Luca "Luke" Pasqualino (born 1990), British actor
 Luca "Lazylegz" Patuelli (born 1984), Canadian breakdancer
 Luca Prodan (1953–1987), Italian musician
 Luca Ragazzi (born 1971), Italian film director, screenwriter, journalist, and actor.
 Luca Rangoni (born 1968), Italian racing driver
 Luca Ranieri (born 1999), Italian football player
 Luca Ravanelli (born 1997), Italian football player
 Luca Righini (born 1990), Italian football player
 Luca Rigoni (born 1984), Italian football player
 Luca Rizzo (born 1992), Italian football player
 Luca della Robbia (1399–1482), Italian sculptor
 Luca Romagnoli (born 1961), Italian politician
 Luca Ronconi (1933–2015), Italian actor, theater director, and opera director
 Luca Rossettini (born 1985), Italian football player
 Luca Sbisa (born 1990), Swiss ice hockey player
 Luca Toni (born 1977), Italian football player
 Luca Turilli (born 1972), Italian musician and composer
 Luca Wackermann (born 1992), Italian cyclist
 Luca Waldschmidt (born 1996), German football player
 Luca Ward (born 1960), Italian actor
 Luca Zidane (born 1998), French football player

Fictional characters
 Luca Abele, a major antagonist in the video game Dishonored 2
 Luca Balsa, a playable survivor in the Chinese horror game Identity V
 Luca Blight, a major antagonist in the video game Suikoden II
 Luca Brasi, in the novel The Godfather and the film adaptation
 Luca Esposito, in the manga and anime Astra Lost in Space
 Luca Lomans, a recurring character in the Belgian series wtFOCK
 Luca McIntyre, a series regular in the soap opera Doctors
 Luca Paguro, the titular main character of the 2021 Pixar film Luca
 Luca Raregroove, a major enemy in the Japanese manga–anime series Rave Master
 Luca (Yu-Gi-Oh! 5D's), from the Yu-Gi-Oh! 5D's anime series
 Luca (Final Fantasy character),  the princess of the Dwarves in the video game Final Fantasy IV
 Luca, in the video game Angry Birds Stella
 Luca, a minor antagonist in the anime series Tweeny Witches
 Luca, one of the main cast in the mobile game series Dragalia Lost
 Luca, a supporting character from the rebooted Planet of the Apes film franchise (2011–2017)
 Luca, a green octopus in the 2004 animated film Shark Tale
 Luca, a recurring character in the Brazilian comic book series Monica and Friends

See also
 Luca (feminine given name)
 Luca (surname)
 Luka (given name)

References

Italian masculine given names
Romanian masculine given names
Spanish masculine given names
Portuguese masculine given names
Sammarinese given names